The Volkswagen Jetta (A7) is a compact car, the seventh generation of the Volkswagen Jetta and the successor to the Volkswagen Jetta (A6). The 2018 Jetta debuted at the 2018 North American International Auto Show in Detroit, Michigan, on 14 January 2018, after Volkswagen released an exterior design sketch in December 2017. The Jetta is based on Volkswagen's MQB platform, which underpins other Volkswagen vehicles including the Volkswagen Golf and the Volkswagen Atlas. The A7 Jetta marked the discontinuation of the nameplate in the European market and right-hand-drive markets.

Overview

North America 
The A7 is larger than its predecessor, offers more interior room and has the latest generation of Volkswagen's infotainment systems, including integration of Apple CarPlay and Android Auto. Its ten-color customizable ambient interior lighting includes lighting across the dashboard and instrument panel, front and rear doors, foot wells, and the gauge "rings" of a newly available fully digital instrument cluster display, marketed as the "Digital Cockpit". Reflector LED headlamps and LED rear tail lamps are standard equipment, and a panoramic sunroof is also available. Heated and ventilated front seats are available as well, as leather-trimmed seating surfaces become available for the first time since the Mk5 Jetta. In addition, Volkswagen is the second automaker in the U.S. to offer a premium Beats Audio audio system.

The Jetta's 1.8 L turbocharged TSI inline four-cylinder gasoline engine has been discontinued, as the outgoing  1.4 L turbocharged TSI inline four-cylinder is the only engine option on the Jetta. A six-speed manual is available on the S and R-Line trim levels with an optional eight-speed automatic, all other trims only offer an eight-speed automatic transmission. On higher trim levels, the Jetta also offers seventeen-inch aluminum-alloy wheels, and Volkswagen Driving Mode Selection. There is also Cross Differential System (XDS), but it is only available on the Jetta R-Line.

Safety features on the Jetta include an Intelligent Crash Response System (ICRS), and a standard safety cage. An automatic post-collision braking system, a tire pressure monitoring system (TPMS), as well as seven safety and stability-enhancing systems all come as standard equipment.

Trim levels of the all-new Jetta in the U.S. are S, SE, R-Line, SEL, and SEL Premium. Trim levels in Canada are Comfortline, Highline (available with optional R-Line package) and Execline, while Mexican trim levels are Trendline, Comfortline, R-Line, and Highline. All trim levels lost the multi-link rear independent suspension for a less expensive torsion-beam rear suspension.

As with its predecessors, production of the all-new 2019 Jetta will continue at Volkswagen's Puebla assembly plant in Mexico. The all-new Jetta reached Volkswagen dealerships in the U.S. in the second quarter of 2018. This new seventh generation Jetta will not be sold in the European market.

In September 2020, the Mexican model introduced a budget trim level for the Jetta named Startline, which slots below the Trendline trim and is equipped with the 1.6-liter MSI engine used by the Virtus sedan, significantly reducing its price, only offered in the Tiptronic 6-speed automatic transmission option, and few units will be sold. It retains the same features from Trendline.

Facelift 
The facelifted Volkswagen Jetta was revealed in Chicago in August 2021 for the 2022 model year. Bearing an updated look and design, the new C-segment sedan also gains added kit and a new engine. The 1.5 litre turbo four-cylinder replaces the long-serving 1.4 TSI. The facelifted model simultaneously arrived to the Mexican market a day later.

Powertrain

Jetta GLI 
The Jetta GLI was revealed at the Chicago Auto Show on 7 February 2019. The GLI features a  EA888 gasoline engine, the same engine from the 2019 Volkswagen Golf GTI. A 6-speed manual transmission is standard, although a 7-speed dual-clutch automatic transmission is available at an additional cost. In addition to the drivetrain upgrades, a multi-link rear suspension and a VAQ electronically controlled limited-slip differential are included. The GLI features a few exterior upgrades from the standard Jetta, including larger 18-inch alloy wheels, a small rear spoiler, different bumpers, and a black grille with a red stripe. Projector LED headlights with LED daytime running lights (DRL) are standard. A 35th-anniversary edition was available as a trim level in 2019. It features a few exterior upgrades. The trim also includes Volkswagen's DCC active suspension which is absent on other trim levels.

Along with the standard Jetta, the GLI received a facelift for 2022 with a revised front and rear bumper. In the United States, the base "S" model was discontinued. The powertrain remains unchanged with the EA888 2.0 litre four-cylinder turbo from the Golf GTI with either a 6-speed manual or 7-speed DSG.

Volkswagen Sagitar (China) 
The Chinese-spec Volkswagen Sagitar long wheelbase was launched on 19 January 2019 both in Beijing and Shanghai. it is about  longer than the US-spec model, and is equipped with independent suspension. This is an attempt to occupy the more upscale market than the Volkswagen Lavida built by SAIC-VW, which share the similar look. Production continues in the FAW-VW Chengdu Plant.

Powertrain 

† Marketed and labeled as such in China

Safety

Latin NCAP
The Mexican-built Jetta in its most basic Latin American configuration with 6 airbags and ESC was qualified 5 stars by Latin NCAP in 2019 in both infant and adult passengers, and is awarded two Latin NCAP Advanced Awards, one for pedestrian safety and other for AEB (Autonomous Emergency Braking).

IIHS
The 2022 Jetta was tested by the IIHS:

References

External links

Compact cars
Front-wheel-drive vehicles
Cars introduced in 2018
Jetta 7
Sedans
2020s cars
Latin NCAP small family cars